Aurélie (or its variants Aurelie or Aurelia) is a feminine name primarily occurring in France, deriving from the Latin Aurelius (golden) family. The masculine forms are Aurèle and Aurélien. The name was historically popular in France, and is currently seeing a resurgence across Europe.

The name is sometimes also given outside of France, especially in Mediterranean countries and the Netherlands. In some cases, the accent aigu on the first e is dropped (Aurelie), and occasionally the final e is replaced with an a (Aurelia), especially in Italy and Romania. Common nicknames include Rory, Arie, and Aurie.

People with this given name

Aurélie Amblard, French actress
Aurélie Claudel (born 1980), French model
Aurélie Dupont (born 1973), French ballet dancer
Aurélie Filippetti (born 1973), member of the National Assembly of France
Aurelia Greene (1934–2021), American politician
Aurélie Groizeleau, French rugby union referee and former player
Aurélie Marie Augustine Razafinjato, Malagasy politician
Aurélie Nemours (1910–2005), Parisian painter
Aurélie Neyret (born 1983), French illustrator and cartoonist
Aurelia Pentón (born 1941), Cuban track and field athlete
Aurelia Ramos de Segarra (1860–1927), Uruguayan philanthropist
Aurélie Rivard (born 1996), Canadian swimmer
Aurelie Sheehan, American novelist and short story writer
Aurelie Thiele, French engineer
Aurelia Tizón (1902–1938), first wife of Argentine president Juan Perón
Aurelia Trywiańska (born 1976), Polish hurdler
Aurelia, Roman noblewoman and mother of Caesar

See also
Aura Lea

References

French feminine given names